Rob Clores is an American, New York-based keyboard player and composer who has toured and recorded with Jesse Malin, The Black Crowes, Tom Jones,     
Men at Work frontman Colin Hay, Marius Muller Westernhagen, Enrique Iglesias, Blues Traveler frontman John Popper, Spin Doctors frontman Chris Barron,  Southside Johnny & The Asbury Jukes, among others.

Solo E.P.
His solo project Split Second Meltdown released an E.P. in 2020. It features original songs with a grunge alternative Rock style.  Contributing musicians include Charlie Paxson 
on drums and Sol Walker on bass from Death Diamond, John JD DeServio from Black Label Society, Bob Pantella from Monster Magnet and Ken Dubman, Jimmy Messer, Tony Bruno and Andee Blacksugar on guitars.

Split Second Meltdown's cover of the Jimi Hendrix song Foxy Lady was released in the U.S. on June 11, 2021 . It features Guns N Roses guitarist Richard Fortus.

Equipment
Clores is endorsed by Nord, Moog and Sequential.

Nord Stage 3
Moog Voyager
Moog Little Phatty
Prophet X
Prophet 6
Mellotron 400M
Hammond B3
Hohner Clavinet D6
Wurlitzer 200A
Hohner accordion

References

External links
https://lnkfi.re/SSM

The Black Crowes members
Living people
Year of birth missing (living people)
American rock keyboardists
21st-century American keyboardists